The 2023 European Mixed Team Judo Championships will be held at the Krynica-Zdrój Arena in Krynica-Zdrój, Poland on 1 July 2023, as part of the 2023 European Games styled Kraków 2023.

References

External links
 

European Mixed Team Judo Championships
European Judo Championships

Judo at the European Games
Judo
Team
European Championships, Team
Judo
Europe
Judo
Judo European Championships, Team
Judo in Poland
European Mixed Team Judo Championships